Candy Regentag is a 1989 Australian film directed by James Ricketson about a young woman who works in a brothel.

The movie was fully funded by the Australian Film Commission and was shot in 16mm in Kings Cross, Sydney during August and September 1986. Much of the film was shot in a brothel constructed for the film.

Release
The film took two years to get a cinema release. James Ricketson later said:
It was a story about a difficult kind of love between a man and a woman that happens to take place in the context of a brothel. But the same relationship could easily have taken place elsewhere. The man is incapable of making any kind of emotional commitment to the woman. The film was not hugely successful and I suppose I don't really think about it very much now. It's probably not a great film, but it's all right.

References

External links

Candy Regentag at Oz Movies

1989 films
Australian romantic drama films
Films scored by Nigel Westlake
Films shot in 16 mm film
1980s English-language films
1980s Australian films